Maimone is a surname. Notable people with the surname include:

Monica Maimone (born 1945), Italian theatre director and playwright
Tony Maimone, American musician

Italian-language surnames